Honeywood is a rural residential locality in the local government area of Brighton in the Hobart region of Tasmania. The 2016 census determined a population of 501 for the state suburb of Honeywood.

History
Honeywood is a confirmed suburb/locality.

Geography
The Jordan River forms most of the western boundary.

Road infrastructure
The C326 route (Briggs Road / Cove Hill Road) enters from the south and runs through to the west, where it exits. Route C325 (a continuation of Briggs Road) starts at an intersection with C326 and runs north until it exits.

References

Localities of Brighton Council (Tasmania)
Towns in Tasmania